The 2004–05 Algerian Cup was the 41st edition of the Algerian Cup. ASO Chlef won the Cup by defeating USM Sétif 1-0 in the final with a goal from Mohamed Messaoud in the 95th minute. It was ASO Chlef's first Algerian Cup in the club's history, as well as its first national title.

Round of 16

Quarter-finals

Semi-finals

Final

Champions

External links
 Coupe d'Algérie 2005
 2004/05 Coupe Nationale

Algerian Cup
Algerian Cup
Algerian Cup